The Ministry of Labour of Pakistan is a government ministry responsible for Labour relations in Pakistan. The Ministry of Labour is headed by a Minister of Labour.

See also
 Government of Pakistan
 Labour in Pakistan
 Child labour in Pakistan

References

External links
 Ministry of Labour of Pakistan

Labour